István György Örkény (5 April 1912, Budapest – 24 June 1979, Budapest) was a Hungarian writer whose plays and novels often featured grotesque situations. He was a recipient of the Kossuth Prize in 1973.

Biography 
He was born to a wealthy Jewish family, his father Hugo was the owner of a pharmacy in Budapest. Two years later, he chose to specialize in pharmacology and received his degree in that subject in 1934.

In 1937, he became associated with the journal  and began traveling; to London and Paris, where he held several odd jobs. He returned to Budapest in 1940 and completed his degree in chemical engineering. He published his first book, Ocean Dance, in 1941. In 1942, he was sent to the Russian Front on the Don River. Due to his Judaism, he was placed in a forced-labor unit. There he was captured and detained in a labour camp near Moscow, where he wrote the play Voronesh. In 1946, he returned home to Budapest.

After 1949, he worked as a dramaturge at the Youth Theater and, after 1951, as a playwright at the People's Army Theater. He was prohibited from publishing after the Revolution and worked as a chemical engineer at  until 1963.
His most famous work, The Toth Family, is about a man who is driven to the verge of insanity and murders the guest his family was having.

He was married three times. His second wife,  was a cookbook writer. They were married from 1948 to 1959. His third wife,  was a prize-winning dramaturge. They were married in 1965.

He died of heart failure in 1979 and was buried in Farkasréti Cemetery. In 2004, the Madách Chamber Theatre in Budapest was renamed the Örkeny Theater in his honour.

Works 
 Ocean Dance
 Voronezh
 Macskajáték (Catsplay)
 Tóték (The Toth Family)
 One Minute Stories (Válogatott egyperces novellák)

References

Further reading
 Örkény, István. One Minute Stories, selected and translated by Judith Sollosy. Budapest: Corvina, 1995. .
 Örkény, István. More One Minute Stories, selected and translated by Judith Sollosy, preface by Péter Esterházy. Budapest: Corvina, 2006. .

External links

 http://www.rev.hu/history_of_56/szerviz/kislex/biograf/orkeny.htm
 http://www.suhrkamp.de/autoren/autor.cfm?id=3598
 http://www.lyrikwelt.de/rezensionen/minutennovellen-r.htm 
 Brockhaus Enzyklopädie 1991 Neunzehnte Auflage, Band 16, S. 274
 István Örkény homepage in English

1912 births
1979 deaths
20th-century Hungarian male writers
Writers from Budapest
Hungarian Jews
Jewish Hungarian-language writers
Burials at Farkasréti Cemetery
Hungarian World War II forced labourers
Hungarian prisoners of war
World War II prisoners of war held by the Soviet Union
World War II civilian prisoners